Liam Michael Feeney-Howard (born 21 January 1987) is an English footballer who plays as a midfielder for Scunthorpe United.

Career

Early career
Feeney joined League One side Southend United on loan until 3 January 2009 in November 2008. He made his debut after coming on as an 80th-minute substitute in a 3–0 defeat to Leicester City on 6 December. He signed for AFC Bournemouth on 2 February for an undisclosed fee.

Feeney scored his first goal for Bournemouth during a 4–0 win over Rochdale.

Millwall
Feeney made his Millwall debut on 11 September 2011 against Birmingham City. After three years with the club, he was released on 10 May 2014.

Loans

On 27 September 2013 Feeney joined Millwall's divisional rivals Bolton Wanderers on a three-month loan deal.

He made his debut, as a substitute for Lee Chung-Yong, the following day in a 1–1 draw against Yeovil Town at the Reebok Stadium.

Millwall exercised their right to activate a 28-day recall clause due to injuries in their squad, meaning an earlier-than-expected return to The Den. He later joined Blackburn Rovers on loan in March.

Bolton Wanderers

On 19 May 2014, Bolton Wanderers announced that Feeney would rejoin the club on a permanent deal once his Millwall contract had expired. He made his second debut on the opening day of the new season in a 3–0 loss to Watford and scored his first goals for Bolton on 4 November, scoring twice in a 3–0 home win against Cardiff City. At the end of the 2015–16 season, the club confirmed that he would be leaving when his contract expired at the end of June.

Ipswich Town (loan)
On 17 March 2016, Feeney signed for Ipswich Town on loan. He made his Blues' debut against Rotherham United, after coming on as a second-half substitute.

Blackburn Rovers
On 25 June 2016, Feeney re-signed for Blackburn Rovers; whom he was previously on loan to, on a two-year deal, with an option of a third year.

On 31 August 2017, Feeney joined Championship side Cardiff City on loan until 1 January 2018. He made his debut at Fulham on 9 September, coming on to set up Danny Ward for the equaliser in a 1–1 draw.

He was released by Blackburn at the end of the 2017–18 season.

Blackpool
On 23 August 2018, Feeney signed for Blackpool on an initial two-year contract. He was given a starting debut in their 2–0 victory over Bristol Rovers at Bloomfield Road.

Feeney scored his first goal for Blackpool in his 66th game for the club. It came in a 3–1 victory over Fleetwood Town at Bloomfield Road on 7 December 2019. It was also his first goal since 7 January 2017, for Blackburn.

Tranmere Rovers
On 17 September 2020, Feeney joined League Two side Tranmere Rovers on a season-long loan deal. Feeney featured in both of Tranmere's play-off matches at the end of the season as they were defeated at the semi-final stage by Morecambe. Following this unsuccessful end to the season, Feeney joined the club on a permanent deal in June 2021 on a one-year deal.

Scunthorpe United
On 26 January 2022, Feeney had his Tranmere contract terminated by mutual consent in order to join Scunthorpe United on a free transfer.

Career statistics

Honours
Cardiff City
EFL Championship runner-up: 2017–18

Tranmere Rovers
EFL Trophy runner-up: 2020–21

References

External links

1987 births
Living people
Footballers from Hammersmith
English footballers
Association football midfielders
Hayes F.C. players
Salisbury City F.C. players
Southend United F.C. players
AFC Bournemouth players
Millwall F.C. players
Bolton Wanderers F.C. players
Ipswich Town F.C. players
Cardiff City F.C. players
Blackburn Rovers F.C. players
Blackpool F.C. players
Tranmere Rovers F.C. players
Scunthorpe United F.C. players
English Football League players
National League (English football) players